Hunter Haas (born December 1, 1976) is an American professional golfer.

Haas was born in Fort Worth, Texas. He won the 1999 U.S. Amateur Public Links. He graduated from the University of Oklahoma in 2000 and turned professional.

Haas is currently a member of the Web.com Tour. Haas was a member of the PGA Tour in 2001, 2005, 2011–2012; and a member of the Nationwide Tour in 2002–2004, 2006–2010, and 2013–2014. He earned his PGA Tour card for 2001 through PGA Tour Qualifying School in his first attempt. In 2001, Haas only made 8 of 30 cuts on Tour, and as a result, he was relegated to the Nationwide Tour for 2002. Haas did not get back to the main tour until 2005, when he finished in 16th on the money list for the 2004 Nationwide Tour season. On the PGA Tour in 2005, Haas fared better than he did in his rookie season but not well enough to retain his tour card. He made 14 of 28 cuts in 2005 including one top-10. Haas returned to PGA Tour Qualifying School in 2007 and finished in a tie for 85th place – not good enough to earn a tour card.

Haas narrowly missed qualifying for the PGA Tour in 2008 by placing 27th on the Nationwide Tour money list, two spots away from a PGA Tour card for 2009. He also had an opportunity at Q-school when he started the final round in 27th place, but shot 71 and finished in 40th.

Haas has won four times on the Nationwide Tour, once each in 2004 and 2006, and twice in 2010. Haas finished third on the 2010 Nationwide Tour money list, which earned him a return trip to the PGA Tour in 2011.

Amateur wins (2)
1998 Big 12 Conference Championship
1999 U.S. Amateur Public Links, Porter Cup

Professional wins (4)

Nationwide Tour wins (4)

Nationwide Tour playoff record (1–1)

Results in major championships

Note: Haas never played in The Open Championship nor the PGA Championship.

 CUT = missed the half-way cut

U.S. national team appearances
Amateur
Walker Cup: 1999

See also
2000 PGA Tour Qualifying School graduates
2004 Nationwide Tour graduates
2010 Nationwide Tour graduates
List of golfers with most Web.com Tour wins

External links

American male golfers
Oklahoma Sooners men's golfers
PGA Tour golfers
Korn Ferry Tour graduates
Golfers from Texas
Sportspeople from Fort Worth, Texas
People from Southlake, Texas
1976 births
Living people